Mark Shapiro (born April 3, 1967) is an American professional baseball executive, currently working as the president and CEO of the Toronto Blue Jays of Major League Baseball (MLB). He worked with the Cleveland Indians from 1991 to 2015, beginning in player development and ending as team president.

Early and personal life
Shapiro was born in Cambridge, Massachusetts, on April 3, 1967. He is the son of Ronald M. Shapiro, an attorney and sports agent in Baltimore, and the brother-in-law of former Cleveland Browns coach Eric Mangini. He graduated from the Gilman School in 1985, after playing first base for the baseball team, and Princeton University in 1989 with a degree in history, after playing center and offensive tackle for the Princeton Tigers football team.

Shapiro has one son, Caden, and one daughter, Sierra. They lived in Bentleyville, Ohio while Shapiro worked for the Indians.

Shapiro was played by actor Reed Diamond in the 2011 film Moneyball.

Baseball career
Shapiro joined the Cleveland Indians organization in 1991, when he was recommended by former Tribe GM Hank Peters. He had worked his way up from player development director to Assistant General Manager, and in 2001 became General Manager.

Shapiro was named Executive of the Year by the Sporting News in 2005 and 2007, following 90+ wins seasons by the Indians, including an American League Central Division Championship in 2007. At the end of the 2010 season, he became the Cleveland Indians team president, with Chris Antonetti succeeding Shapiro as general manager.

On August 31, 2015, The Toronto Blue Jays announced that Shapiro would become their new president and Chief Executive Officer (CEO) at the end of the 2015 season, succeeding Paul Beeston. Shapiro did not formally begin working in the new role until October 31, 2015, the same day that Beeston retired. In a press conference on November 2, Shapiro named Tony LaCava the interim general manager, to replace Alex Anthopoulos. Subsequently, on December 3, 2015, Ross Atkins was named as the team's sixth general manager, under him.

Awards
 Two-time Sporting News Executive of the Year (2005, 2007)
 Honorary Doctor of Letters from Baldwin Wallace University (2014)
 2007 American League Central Division Champion (as Indians Executive VP/GM)

References

Further reading

1967 births
American expatriate baseball people in Canada
Businesspeople from Baltimore
Cleveland Indians executives
Gilman School alumni
Jewish American baseball people
Living people
Major League Baseball executives
Major League Baseball general managers
Major League Baseball team presidents
Princeton University alumni
Princeton Tigers football players
Toronto Blue Jays executives
People from Cuyahoga County, Ohio
21st-century American Jews